Perry Mason: The Case of the Mandarin Murder is an interactive fiction computer game with graphics. The game was published by Telarium (formerly known as Trillium), a subsidiary of Spinnaker Software, in 1985.

Description
The game is based on the popular TV series Perry Mason starring Raymond Burr, who played the fictional defense attorney of the same name created by Erle Stanley Gardner. The player must save client Laura Knapp from being convicted of the murder of her husband Victor.

Reception  
Antic Amiga in 1985 called Perry Mason "a major breakthrough in interactive fiction."

References

External links  
 
 
 Perry Mason: The Case of the Mandarin Murder at Museum of Computer Adventure Game History by Howard Feldman

1980s interactive fiction
1985 video games
Amiga games
Apple II games
Commodore 64 games
Criminal law video games
DOS games
Interactive fiction based on works
MSX games
Case of the Mandarin Murder
Single-player video games
Telarium games
Video games based on novels
Video games developed in the United States